Youssef Sidhom is the editor-in-chief of the Egyptian weekly newspaper Watany, the only Christian newspaper in Egypt. He is the son of Watani's founder, Anton Sidhom.

Youssef Sidhom is a prominent advocate of Coptic Christian rights in Egypt.

References 

Coptic Christians from Egypt
Coptic rights activists
Living people
Year of birth missing (living people)
Egyptian activists
Egyptian newspaper editors